"Kitto Eien ni" is pop singer Crystal Kay's nineteenth single. It was released on January 17, 2007 as the first single for Kay's seventh studio album All Yours. This was Kay's first single since February 2006. The song, a ballad, was used as the ending theme of the live-action film adaptation of the manga  by Kotomi Aoki which stars Jun Matsumoto and Nana Eikura as Yori and Iku, fraternal twins who fall in love despite being siblings.

The single's B-side "As One" was used as J-Wave's Christmas campaign song in December 2008.

Track listing

Charts

External links 
 Boku wa Imōto ni Koi o Suru @ IMDB

2007 singles
Crystal Kay songs
2007 songs
Epic Records singles
Japanese film songs